Eli Hirsch (born 1938) is an American philosopher and the Charles Goldman Professor of Philosophy at Brandeis University.

He is best known for his work in meta-ontology.  He coined the phrase "soft ontology" and has authored over 70 books and papers.  Many of his books deal with objections to ontology based upon common sense and that most disputes involving metaphysical objects revolve around linguistics and are merely verbal in nature.  Among his books are "Against Revisionary Ontology" (1982 - Oxford University Press) and "Physical-Object Ontology, Verbal Disputes, and Common Sense" (2005 - Philosophy and Phenomenological Research 70 (1):67–97).

Hirsch received a Ph.D. and M.A. from NYU, and a B.A. from CUNY Brooklyn College.

See also
 Quantifier variance

References

Ontologists
American philosophers
Living people
Brandeis University faculty
Brooklyn College alumni
1938 births
Harvard Extension School faculty